TG3 is an Italian news programme.

TG3 may also refer to:
 Schweizer TG-3 military glider
 Candidate phylum TG3, a candidate bacterial phylum that is closely related to the phylum Fibrobacteres